Migammana is a village in Sri Lanka. Migammana may also refer to the following villages in Sri Lanka:

Migammana Ihalagammedda 
Migammana Mahagammedda
Migammana Pallegama